Kenneth Alwyne Pounds, CBE, FRS (born 17 November 1934) is Emeritus Professor of physics at the University of Leicester.

Early life
He was born in Bradford, Yorkshire, where he went to Salt Grammar School (now Titus Salt School in Baildon). He then attended University College London where he gained his BSc and in 1961 a PhD under the supervision of Harrie Massey and Robert Lewis Fullarton Boyd.

Career 
He then moved to the University of Leicester as Assistant Lecturer in 1960. He became Deputy Director of Space Research in 1967, and was one of the pioneers of using rockets and satellites for research in the UK. He became first Director of the X-ray Astronomy group in 1974. His research is in the area of active galaxies, and one of his many discoveries is that black holes are common in the universe.

Ken Pounds became Professor of Space Physics in 1973. He was appointed Head of the Department of Physics in 1986, and the following year took the decision to merge with the Astronomy department to create the present Department of Physics and Astronomy.

He was a member of the Science and Engineering Research Council, 1980–1984; President of the Royal Astronomical Society, 1990–1992; and was seconded as the first Chief Executive of the newly formed Particle Physics and Astronomy Research Council, 1994–1998, following the restructuring of the Research Councils. He then returned to Leicester as Head of Department until his retirement in 2002. He remains active in the Department as a research fellow.

Awards and honours 
Pounds was elected a Fellow of the Royal Society in 1981, and appointed a CBE in 1984. He holds five honorary doctorates, including the rare distinction of an honorary degree from his own institution, the University of Leicester, in 2005. The asteroid 4281 Pounds, discovered by Edward Bowell in 1985, was named in his honour. The official naming citation was published by the Minor Planet Center on 4 October 1990. In 2010, the National Portrait Gallery, London purchased a portrait of Pounds by the photographer Max Alexander for its permanent collection.

References

External links 
 Pounds, Kenneth A., ISI HighlyCited.com
 End of an Era in Physics and Astronomy – University of Leicester press release on Ken Pounds's retirement, October 2002
 University of Leicester Bulletin (PDF), December 2005 / January 2006 – Ken Pounds receives honorary degree
 

1934 births
Scientists from Bradford
20th-century British astronomers
English physicists
Commanders of the Order of the British Empire
Fellows of the Royal Society
Alumni of University College London
Academics of the University of Leicester
Living people
Recipients of the Gold Medal of the Royal Astronomical Society
Presidents of the Royal Astronomical Society
Science and Technology Facilities Council